Ji Chao (Chinese: 纪超; born 1 January 1991 in Shenyang) is a Chinese footballer.

Club career
In 2010, Ji Chao started his professional footballer career with Shenzhen Ruby in the Chinese Super League. In February 2011, he transferred to Chinese Super League side Liaoning Whowin. He would eventually make his league debut for Liaoning on 28 September 2012 in a game against Tianjin Teda, coming on as a substitute for Jiang Peng in the 66th minute. In February 2013, Ji moved to China League Two side Qingdao Hainiu on a one-year loan deal. Ji received a ban of half year from 22 March 2017 to 21 September 2017 by the Chinese Football Association for falsity of his registration information.

Career statistics 
Statistics accurate as of match played 31 December 2020.

Honours

Club
Shenyang Urban
 China League Two: 2019

References

External links

1991 births
Living people
Chinese footballers
Footballers from Shenyang
Shenzhen F.C. players
Liaoning F.C. players
Qingdao F.C. players
Liaoning Shenyang Urban F.C. players
Chinese Super League players
China League Two players
Association football midfielders